News Cafe is a full-service cafe-bar and cocktail franchise restaurant chain founded in South Africa since 1995.

The first News Cafe opened in 1995 in Hatfield, Pretoria, shortly after the lifting of sanctions against South Africa signalled the entry of overseas hospitality franchises such as McDonald's into the South African food service market. In 2009 the first News Cafe was opened in India, followed by the second early in 2010.

The News Cafe brand is owned by the operating company Fournews headquartered in Edenvale (Ekurhuleni); it has branches across southern Africa, including a News Cafe in Zimbabwe, Kenya, Gaborone, Botswana and in Ndola, Zambia.

See also
 List of restaurants in South Africa

References 

Coffeehouses and cafés in South Africa
Restaurant chains in South Africa
Economy of Ekurhuleni
Companies based in Germiston